Susan Catania ( Kmetty; born December 10, 1941) is an American former politician who served as a Republican member of the Illinois House of Representatives from 1973 to 1983. She was involved in women's rights issues, and led the unsuccessful effort to get the federal Equal Rights Amendment (ERA) ratified by the Illinois General Assembly. Catania also served as chairperson of the Illinois Commission on the Status of Women. A representative from Chicago, she was described as a liberal, feminist, and maverick member of the Republican legislative caucus.

Catania was born in Chicago, and received a bachelor's degree in chemistry from Saint Xavier University. She then worked for a chemical research firm before being elected to the House of Representatives. She represented a heavily African American and Democratic district, but a Republican could still represent the district under the state's cumulative voting system. In the House, Catania introduced gay rights bills and the Freedom of Information Act, but both efforts were unsuccessful. During her tenure, she sponsored over 50 bills that became law, including the Crime Victim Compensation Act and a bill that designated Martin Luther King Jr. Day as a state holiday, both of which were enacted in 1973.

Cumulative voting was abolished by the Cutback Amendment in 1981, and Catania lost any chance to retain her seat in the House going forward. During the 1982 elections, she ran for lieutenant governor, but lost the Republican primary, which was seen as a referendum on ratification of the ERA. Afterward, she served on committees for the Chicago 1992 World's Fair. Her political career continued in a variety of capacities, including as a fellow at the Harvard Institute of Politics in 1983, and a delegate to the 1984 Republican National Convention. She ran for Cook County Board of Commissioners in 1986, and Cook County Recorder of Deeds in 1992, but lost both elections. She later worked for the state's Department of Children and Family Services and Department of Human Services.

Early years and personal life 

Born in Chicago on December 10, 1941, Susan Kmetty grew up in the city's South Side. She attended Catholic schools, including Mother McAuley High School. She received a Bachelor of Arts degree in chemistry from Saint Xavier University, and later did one year of graduate studies in chemistry at Northwestern University.

Kmetty's education, and the fact that both of her parents worked, motivated her to work full time in an era when many men assumed women were to stay at home. She worked as an information director for a chemical research firm in Chicago. She hired a babysitter, and lived near her workplace, allowing her to nurse her baby during her break. She quit that job, and filed a sex discrimination lawsuit, after her employer hired a man with less experience but offered him twice the pay.

She was married to Anthony E. Catania for 58 years before his death in 2022. They had seven children, three of whom were born during her tenure as a state representative.

Illinois House of Representatives 
Catania became involved in politics when advocating against provisions in the state's unemployment law that she claimed discriminated against women. In 1972, she won election to the Illinois House of Representatives. She held the Republican seat in her district that was available under the state's cumulative voting system, in which each district elected three members. Her district was predominantly African American and Democratic. Catania has been described as a liberal, feminist, and maverick. She often defied her party's leadership, supporting gun control and abortion, but faced few repercussions as there is no Republican organization in the South Side of Chicago.

She joined a small group of women legislators who focused on women's rights issues in the 1970s, and served as chairperson of the Illinois Commission on the Status of Women for eight years. In 1974, she shocked male legislators by bringing her infant daughter to the House floor and nursing her baby in the women's restroom.

She credited disposable diapers with helping her care for her babies while traveling for legislative business. Catania supported the federal Displaced Homemakers Act, which addressed women seeking to enter or re-enter the workforce. She testified at hearings of a US House subcommittee in 1976, and a US Senate subcommittee in 1977. Catania was chief sponsor of the unsuccessful effort to get the federal Equal Rights Amendment (ERA) ratified by the General Assembly, breaking with Speaker George Ryan, who opposed the ERA. Ryan later declined to reappoint her to the Commission on the Status of Women.

In 1979, Catania proposed an amendment to the Illinois Human Rights Act, which had passed the Senate with the sponsorship of Senator Harold Washington. Catania's amendment, which would have allowed women guarantees in the use of credit cards, passed the House but was not accepted by the Senate. As Catania refused to back down, the bill deadlocked, and the General Assembly adjourned at the end of June. After additional negotiations, the act was re-introduced in November without Catania's amendment, and the bill became law in December. That same year, she won an award named after Susan B. Anthony for her legislative leadership on women's issues.

In January 1973, Catania introduced a bill that designated Martin Luther King Jr. Day as a state holiday. She was joined as sponsors by Washington (then a state representative) and Peggy Smith Martin, and the bill was signed in September of the same year by Governor Dan Walker. Catania introduced gay rights bills as early as 1976, partnering with legislators Robert E. Mann and Leland H. Rayson. Catania and Elroy Sundquist, a fellow Republican in the House, also sponsored bills to prohibit discrimination based on sexual orientation. However, in 1977 the legislation was overwhelmingly defeated, with a vote of 38–114. In 1974, Catania was the first to sponsor the Freedom of Information Act. Chicago-based Democrats in the General Assembly often opposed freedom of information initiatives in the mid-1970s, referring the matters back to legislative committees to avoid consideration. Catania also sponsored the Crime Victim Compensation Act, which passed in 1973.

Catania encouraged voters to support Republican U.S. Senator Charles H. Percy. She also rallied constituents against Edward Hanrahan, the Democratic state's attorney for Cook County, for playing a controversial role in the killing of Black Panthers Fred Hampton and Mark Clark. In 1980, Catania supported John B. Anderson during the Republican Party presidential primaries. Shortly after the 1980 presidential election, she criticized Ronald Reagan's military defense policies.

Cumulative voting was abolished by the Cutback Amendment in 1981, and Catania lost any chance to retain her seat in the House going forward. Throughout her tenure, she sponsored over 50 bills that became law, addressing topics that included domestic violence, child support, joint custody, school bus safety, grandparents' visitation rights, state income tax reform, and a rape shield law.

Post-House political career 
Catania ran for the Republican nomination for lieutenant governor in 1982. It was also a form of retaliation against George Ryan, who had opposed her reappointment to the Commission on the Status of Women and was also running for lieutenant governor. As the only candidate to openly support the ERA, Catania collected donations from feminists nationwide who were hoping to get Illinois to ratify the amendment. At the time, Illinois was the only northern industrial state that had not ratified, and national ERA leaders viewed the election as a potential referendum on the amendment. The National Organization for Women supported Catania, while Phyllis Schlafly, an ERA opponent, recognized the importance of the race and opposed her. Governor James R. Thompson backed Ryan in the race, and mainstream Republicans in Illinois regarded Catania "as radical as Leon Trotsky". Catania lost the primary, coming in second place to Ryan. Afterwards, she continued lobbying on women's rights issues.

Starting in December 1982, Catania was a member of the women's committee of the Chicago 1992 World's Fair. She also served on the advisory committee, formed in July 1983, of Harold Washington, who by then had been elected mayor of Chicago. In spring 1983, Catania was a fellow at the Harvard Institute of Politics for six months, studying women in politics. On June 7, 1984, she testified before the US Senate Committee on Foreign Relations during a hearing regarding the role of women in the economic development of the Third World. During the 1984 Republican National Convention, Catania gained national attention as the only delegate who refused to support the Reagan–Bush slate. In 1986, she ran in the at-large election to be a member of the Cook County Board of Commissioners representing Chicago, succeeding in the primary to be one of ten Republican nominees, but losing the general election. During Chicago's mayoral election in 1987, she was mentioned as a potential candidate for the Republican primary.

By 1992, Catania ran her own consulting firm. She helped open a daycare center for state employees in Chicago. During the 1992 elections in Cook County, she was the Republican nominee for recorder of deeds, losing the election to Democratic nominee Jesse White.

Later life 

By 1995, Catania worked for the Department of Children and Family Services. As the Cook County family development coordinator, she was responsible for establishing foster-care homes. By 1998, she worked for the Department of Human Services, overseeing the state's program for preventing and responding to sexual assault.

In 2016, Catania supported Democratic nominee Tammy Duckworth for the United States Senate election in Illinois, and also Democratic nominee Hillary Clinton for the presidential election. As of 2018, she lived in Buffalo Grove, Illinois.

Electoral history

Illinois House of Representatives elections

Later elections

Notes

1941 births
Living people
Politicians from Chicago
Northwestern University alumni
Saint Xavier University alumni
Women state legislators in Illinois
Republican Party members of the Illinois House of Representatives
21st-century American women